Perylenetetracarboxylic dianhydride (PTCDA) is an organic dye molecule and an organic semiconductor. It is used as a precursor to a class of molecules known as Rylene dyes, which are useful as pigments and dyes. It is a dark red solid with low solubility in aromatic solvents.  The compound has attracted much interest as an organic semiconductor.

Structure 
PTCDA consists of a perylene core to which two anhydride groups have been attached, one at either side. It occurs in two crystalline forms, α and β. Both have the P21/c monoclinic symmetry and a density of ca. 1.7 g/cm3, which is relatively high for organic compounds. Their lattice parameters are:

Self-assembly and films

Use

The main industrial use of PTCDA is as a precursor to Rylene dyes.

References 

Perylene dyes
Vat dyes
Organic semiconductors